is a Japanese footballer currently playing as a midfielder for Gainare Tottori.

Club career
Having previously captained the University of Tsukuba football team, Chiku joined Singapore Premier League side Albirex Niigata Singapore ahead of the 2021 season. After one season in Singapore, Chiku returned to Japan to sign for J3 League side Gainare Tottori ahead of the 2022 season.

Career statistics

Club
.

Notes

References

1999 births
Living people
Association football people from Saitama Prefecture
University of Tsukuba alumni
Japanese footballers
Japanese expatriate footballers
Association football midfielders
Singapore Premier League players
J3 League players
Urawa Red Diamonds players
Albirex Niigata Singapore FC players
Gainare Tottori players
Japanese expatriate sportspeople in Singapore
Expatriate footballers in Singapore